Torshkhoy, also known as Torshkhoy-warriors — Ingush taïp which belongs to the Fyappin society. The ancestral aul of Torshkhoy is Tyarsh. A small number of representatives of the taïp live in Aukh, where they are known under the name Vyappiy.

History 
In the Tarskaya valley, the first ten-verst map of the Caucasus, published in 1847 (hence, before the eviction of the Ingush from there in 1859), shows the village of Tarshoy-Yurt, inhabited by the Veppins. Nevertheless, the subordinate role of the Veppins in the colonization of the northern plain is undeniable.

In folklore 
In 1961, according to the words of 95-year-old Murzabekov Abdul Bimurzievich, in the presence of 98-year-old Murzabekov Labzan Khunievich, 90-year-old Torshkhoev Murtsal Tosoltovich, the following legend was recorded:

Notable people 
 Zarifa Sautieva — political activist

References

Bibliography 
 
 
 
 
 

Ingush people